Julian Brown (born 1974) is a British artist. He lives and works in London. He studied at Liverpool John Moores University, England (1993–96) and Royal Academy Schools, London (1998–2001). His work is heavily influenced by childhood visions and the folk-art from his Polish mother. He was long-listed for the John Moores Painting Prize in 2016 and in 2012 was shortlisted for the Marmite Prize in Painting IV (2012–13). Brown has exhibited his work nationally and internationally and is a member of Contemporary British Painting.

Selected collections 
 Abbot Hall Art Gallery
 China Academy of Art
 The Priseman Seabrook Collection of 21st Century British Painting
 Falmouth Art Gallery

Selected solo exhibitions 
 2013 – Julian Brown (with Chris Daniels), Mayor's Parlour, London
 2014 – Julian Brown at St. Marylebone Crypt, London
 2016 – A Sense of Wonder, York College Gallery, York, England
 2017 – Mono Fauna, Westminster Arts Library, London

Selected group exhibitions 
 2014 – Priseman Seabrook Collection, Huddersfield Art Gallery, England
 2015 – Contemporary British Abstraction, SE9 Container Gallery, London
 2015 – @PaintBritain, Ipswich Art College Gallery, Ipswich, England
 2015 – Contemporary British Drawing, X'Ian Academy of Fine Arts, China
 2015 – Contemporary British Watercolours, Maidstone Museum and Bentlif Art Gallery, England
 2016 – Contemporary British Watercolours, Burton Art Gallery & Museum, Bideford, Devon, England
 2016 – John Moores Painting Prize Exhibition, Walker Art Gallery, Liverpool, England

References

External links 
 Priseman Seabrook Collection
 Contemporary British Painting

1975 births
Living people
21st-century English painters
21st-century English male artists
English male painters
English people of Polish descent
Alumni of Liverpool John Moores University
Alumni of the Royal Academy Schools